23 Corps, 23rd Corps, Twenty Third Corps, or XXIII Corps may refer to:

XXIII Reserve Corps (German Empire), a unit of the Imperial German Army during World War I
XXIII Corps (United States)
XXIII Corps (United Kingdom)
XXIII Corps (Union Army), a unit in the American Civil War

See also
 List of military corps by number
 23rd Battalion (disambiguation)
 23rd Brigade (disambiguation)
 23rd Division (disambiguation)
 23 Squadron (disambiguation)